George Hanna or Hanna Jurgis (13 May 1928 – 3 May 2019), later known as John Hanna Hallaq, was an Iraqi basketball player. He competed in the men's tournament at the 1948 Summer Olympics. 

Hanna later immigrated to the United States in 1958, and attended Weber State College, University of California, Los Angeles, and the University of Washington (PhD). After obtaining his PhD, he became  a professor of International Business & Marketing at the University of Idaho in Moscow, Idaho and Washington State University in Pullman, Washington until his retirement in 1996. Hanna died in St. George, Utah in 2019 at the age of 90.

References

1928 births
2019 deaths
Iraqi men's basketball players
Iraqi emigrants to the United States
Olympic basketball players of Iraq
Basketball players at the 1948 Summer Olympics
Place of birth missing
Weber State University alumni
University of California, Los Angeles alumni
University of Washington alumni
University of Idaho faculty
Washington State University faculty